Birkenhead United AFC  is an amateur football club based in Beach Haven, on the North Shore of Auckland, New Zealand. They currently compete in the Northern League.

Club history
The club was established as Birkenhead in 1960 before it amalgamated with Birkdale in 1963 taking its current name as Birkenhead United.

Present day
Since 1965, Birkenhead have mainly played either in Division 1 or Division 2 of the Northern League though they twice early on, made it into Premier Division in 1968 and 1970, only to be relegated again that same year. They also had one of their best early runs in the 1970 Chatham Cup, making it to the 5th round before losing to Eden 1–4. They wouldn't repeat that success in the cup again until 2010. Again going down in the 5th round, this time to Glenfield Rovers.

Birkenhead started to see more success in the 2010s, with them again making the Premier Division in 2013 and they have stayed there since. They have just missed out on winning the division four times in 2013, 2014, 2016 and 2017. The success in the local league was also replicated in the Chatham Cup, where in 2012 and 2013 they made the quarter-finals. 2015 they made the semi-finals, only losing 3–4 on penalties to Napier City Rovers, before they finally won the cup in 2016, beating local rivals Waitakere City 3–2 in extra time. They wouldn't have to wait very long before they won the cup again, when in the 2018 Chatham Cup, they made the finals. This time they were facing Wellington side Western Suburbs and after 120 minutes the score was tied 1–1 before Birkenhead prevailed on penalties 5–4 to claim the cup for a second time in three years.

In 2021, the club formed a strategic partnership with Scottish Premiership outfit, St Mirren FC alongside Nelson Suburbs.

Current squad

References

External links
Club website

Association football clubs in Auckland
Association football clubs established in 1963
1963 establishments in New Zealand